Twelve Days of Rugrats is the first single from the Rugrats' Rugrats Holiday Classics. It also is one of the 3 MP3 downloadable tracks released October 12, 2004, as the Rugrats Holiday Classics CD.

Track listing
"Twelve Days of Rugrats" - 4:18

Music video
There is no video for "Twelve Days of Rugrats" since it was not featured on Rugrats. But there is a Rugrats song that had its own music video, Tales From the Crib: Snow White.

2005 singles
2004 songs